Arms & Hammers is the third studio album by the American hip hop group Strong Arm Steady, released on February 22, 2011, on Blacksmith Records/Element 9. The production was handled by many names, like DJ Khalil, Nottz, Jelly Roll and Terrace Martin. Madlib, who produced the entirety of their last album, contributed just one track, the sequel of "Chiba Chiba".

Track listing 
Confirmed by iTunes.

Chart history

References 

2011 albums
Strong Arm Steady albums
Albums produced by David Banner
Albums produced by DJ Khalil
Albums produced by JellyRoll
Albums produced by Nottz
Albums produced by Terrace Martin
Albums produced by Mars (record producer)